Sitesh Ranjan Deb (known as Sitesh Babu), is a former professional hunter in Bangladesh who is now a notable wildlife conservationist.

Personal life 

Deb grew up in a family that had been hunters, and in his youth, when hunting was not legally restricted, he himself was a professional hunter and wilderness guide. However, his life changed in an accident in 1991 when he unexpectedly came face to face with a bear. He was injured severely, losing part of his face and right eye, before he managed to shoot the bear. He quit hunting and focused on wildlife conservation.

Zoo 

Locally, wild animals and their habitat have rapidly diminished as an enlarging human population has led to deforestation, often illegally, for timber and firewood. Even before he stopped hunting altogether he had developed a zoo which has rescued, rehabilitated and freed more than 3,000 animals. The zoo has hosted many rare animal species such as the first recorded Burmese ferret-badger in Bangladesh. His work has been featured in numerous news articles.

References

External links 
 International Research Journal on Burmese ferret-badger at Sitesh Ranjan’s zoo.

Year of birth missing (living people)
Living people
Bangladeshi conservationists